is a fighting game by Capcom that was originally released for the arcade and PlayStation 2 in 2003 in Japan and in 2004 in North America and Asia. Released to commemorate the 15th anniversary of the Street Fighter series, Hyper Street Fighter II is a modified port of Super Street Fighter II Turbo in which players can control any versions of the main characters from the five Street Fighter II games previously released for arcade. Although originally released as a home console game, an arcade port was released shortly afterwards in limited quantities, turning it into the sixth arcade iteration. This game is also the last to use the CP System II.

The PlayStation 2 version was released in Japan and Europe. In North America, it was released in a two-in-one disc titled Street Fighter Anniversary Collection, which also features Street Fighter III: 3rd Strike. The Anniversary Collection version was later ported to the Xbox in all regions. On February 20, 2022, it was announced that Hyper Street Fighter II: The Anniversary Edition will be ported as a part of Capcom Fighting Collection on June 24, 2022 to PlayStation 4, Xbox One, Nintendo Switch, and PC.

Gameplay
The opening sequence has been altered to use a modified version of the Super Street Fighter II intro, in which logos of the past five games appear flashing into the screen. The background music played during the player select screen was also reverted to the theme used in Super Street Fighter II.

Once the game is started, the player has to select a game speed, and then they are asked to choose one of the five Street Fighter II games, which will limit the selectable characters to the roster of the selected game.
 "Normal" features the eight characters from the original Street Fighter II. If both players choose this version of the game, mirror matches will not be allowed, as the original game did not support them, even lacking different character color palettes.
 "Champ" ("Dash" in the Japanese version) is based on Street Fighter II: Champion Edition and adds the four Shadaloo Bosses as playable fighters.
 "Turbo" is based on Street Fighter II: Hyper Fighting.
 "Super" adds the four new characters from Super Street Fighter II.
 "Super T" ("Super X" in the Japanese version) is based on Super Street Fighter II Turbo and adds Akuma.

This selection determines all the characteristics the chosen character originally had in the selected game, from the set of moves and animation frames, to its voice and portrait picture. This leads to a roster of 17 unique characters with a total 65 different character variations.

The stages and endings are exactly the same as in Super Street Fighter II Turbo, although some of the stages restore background elements from the original Street Fighter II that were eliminated from subsequent installments, such as the breakable signs in Ryu's stage and palm tree in Sagat's stage.

In the home versions of Hyper Street Fighter II, the player can choose to play the game with the soundtracks from the CPS1 or CPS2 versions, as well as the remixed soundtrack previously featured in the FM-Towns versions of Super Street Fighter II and the 3DO version of Super Street Fighter II Turbo. An edited version of Street Fighter II: The Animated Movie is also included as a bonus.

References

External links
 Official website for the PS2 version 
 Hyper Street Fighter II: The Anniversary Edition at MobyGames

2003 video games
Arcade video games
Capcom games
CP System II games
Fighting games
2D fighting games
Fighting games used at the Evolution Championship Series tournament
Fighting games used at the Super Battle Opera tournament
PlayStation 2 games
NESiCAxLive games
Video games developed in Japan
Video games set in Brazil
Video games set in China
Video games set in England
Video games set in Hong Kong
Video games set in India
Video games set in Jamaica
Video games set in Japan
Video games set in Mexico
Video games set in Myanmar
Video games set in the Soviet Union
Video games set in Spain
Video games set in Thailand
Video games set in the United States
Xbox games